The Suzuki Eiger 400 is an all-terrain vehicle (4-wheel motorcycle) from Suzuki. It has a 376 cc, single overhead cam, four-stroke, single cylinder, air/oil-cooled engine, weighs , has a  gas tank, and offers two wheel or four wheel drive. There is a choice of a 5-speed semi-automatic transmission with an automatic clutch, or a fully-automatic continuously variable transmission.

The drive system is a hybrid belt-shaft system.  The engine powers the drive belt, which in turn provides the power to the shaft as its final drive train to the axles.

The Suzuki Eiger has a torque-sensing differential in the front on the 4x4 model.

Suzuki ATVs